Andalouse may refer to:

Music
Andalouse, Émile Pessard arr. Robert Neil Cavally
Sérénade andalouse, Op. 28 by Pablo de Sarasate
Sérénade andalouse, music by C. Ruecker for La Argentina
"Andalouse" (Kendji Girac song), a 2014 song by French singer Kendji Girac

Other uses
Sauce andalouse, a Belgian specialty sauce
Les Andalouses, a location near Aïn El Turk